The Alexandria Museum of Art (AMoA) of Alexandria, central Louisiana, United States opened its doors in 1977 in downtown Alexandria in the historic Rapides Bank and Trust Company Building (circa 1898). Rapides Bank and Trust Company Building is a historic bank building completed in 1898 in the Renaissance Revival style, and was added to the National Register of Historic Places on May 15, 1980. In 1998, AMoA expanded and constructed its grand foyer and offices as an annex to the Rapides Bank Building.  In 1999, AMoA was honored as an Outstanding Arts Organization in the Louisiana Governor's Arts Awards. In 2007, the Museum entered into a collaborative endeavor agreement with Louisiana State University of Alexandria (LSUA). AMoA now also serves as a downtown campus for LSUA classes and is host to multidisciplinary community events, including concerts and recitals, lectures, yoga classes, Second Saturday Markets, and Museum Afterhours. These events support all art forms – film, literature and poetry, songwriting and visual arts.

The Museum holds between five and seven exhibitions each year, displaying a variety of historic and contemporary subjects. AMoA offers multidisciplinary programming surrounding every exhibit, including lectures and master classes on the subject of or in the medium of the exhibit. Additionally AMoA engages elementary-aged Rapides Parish students by offering the ArtExpress program, a free-to-schools initiative that puts resident artist educators and museum staff in classrooms around the parish for arts-integrated lessons. The Art2Go program provides hands on visual art workshops free to elementary school teachers to support the Louisiana Board of Elementary and Secondary Education requirements to provide 1 hour per week of visual arts instruction in the classroom and are taught by certified art teachers. The Museum also offers summer workshops for elementary and middle school students and provides arts activities in the Bolton Avenue Community Center afterschool program.

References

External links
 

Art museums established in 1977
Contemporary art galleries in the United States
Museums in Rapides Parish, Louisiana
Folk art museums and galleries in Louisiana
Institutions accredited by the American Alliance of Museums
1977 establishments in Louisiana
Tourist attractions in Alexandria, Louisiana
Commercial buildings on the National Register of Historic Places in Louisiana
Renaissance Revival architecture in Louisiana
Commercial buildings completed in 1989
Buildings and structures completed in 1898
Buildings and structures in Alexandria, Louisiana
1898 establishments in Louisiana
National Register of Historic Places in Rapides Parish, Louisiana